Merkur is an automobile brand.

Merkur may also refer to:

Companies and organizations
 Merkur Solingen, a German manufacturer of shaving equipment
 Merkur AG, originally a Swiss company selling coffee and chocolate, now known as the retail conglomerate Valora Holding AG
 Merkur Department Store, a former department store in early 20th century Stuttgart, Germany
 HanseMerkur, an insurance company under the umbrella of Gothaer Group based in Cologne, Germany
 Merkur, a supermarket chain in Austria owned by REWE Group, merged with Billa in April 2021
 Interhotel Merkur was a hotel in Leipzig, today The Westin Leipzig

Publications
 Merkur (magazine), a German intellectual magazine
 Rheinischer Merkur, a nationwide German weekly newspaper
 Münchner Merkur, a newspaper of Munich
 Der teutsche Merkur, an influential German literary review founded in 1773 by Christoph Martin Wieland

Vehicles and transportation
 Merkur (train), an express train in Europe
 Merkur spacecraft, the name given in the West to the VA spacecraft
 MV Merkur (1924), a passenger cargo vessel

Other uses
 Merkur (toy), a metal construction set built in Czechoslovakia
 Operation Merkur, a German airborne attack during the Battle of Crete in World War II
 Merkur (mountain), in the Black Forest near Baden-Baden, Germany
 RD Merkur, a team handball club from Škofja Loka, Slovenia
 Merkur Spiel-Arena, a stadium in Düsseldorf, Germany

See also 
 Mercur (disambiguation)
 Mercury (disambiguation)